Elcy is a given name. Notable people with the name include:

 Elcy (footballer) (born 1938), Brazilian football striker
 Elcy Lui (born 2002), American Samoan women's football forward

See also
 Ely (given name)